Megalodon（ウェブ魚拓,web gyotaku） is an on demand web citation service based in Japan.

Overview 
One of Megalodon's aims is to enable people to make copies of web pages to quote as part of public discourse. For example, to provide an earlier copy of a terms and conditions page for comparison when an update is announced. It is also used to cite web resources. Users have the option between archiving a page's desktop and mobile variant.

Megalodon's server can be searched for "web gyotaku" or copies of web pages, by prefixing any URL with "gyo.tc"; the process checks the query against other services as well, including Google's cached pages and Mementos.

On 12 November 2010, Afility revealed that all files copied before the first half of 2007 were lost because of a malfunction in their backup process.

Megalodon does not archive sites which include a "noindex" or "noarchive" tag in the robots.txt file.

See also 

 Web Archiving Initiatives
 Wayback Machine
 archive.today

References

External links 

 https://megalodon.jp/
 https://www.affility.co.jp/

Internet properties established in 2005
Japanese websites
Online archives
2005 establishments in Japan